William Hamilton Mitchell Acton (16 August 1906 – 31 August 1945) was an Anglo-Italian painter.

Biography
William Hamilton Mitchell Acton was born on 16 August 1906, the son of Arthur Acton (1873–1953), an art collector and dealer, and Hortense Lenore Mitchell (1871–1962), the heiress of John J. Mitchell, President of the Illinois Trust and Savings Bank. Harold Acton was his older brother.

He attended Chateau de Lancy, Geneva, and Eton College; at Eton his contemporaries were Robert Byron, Brian Howard, Alfred Duggan and Anthony Powell, who remembers William fondly in his memoirs.

In 1922 a reproduction of his painting Nature Morte appeared in the Eton Candle. At Eton he was among the founders of the Eton Society of Arts in February 1922 with Brian Howard, Henry Yorke, his brother Harold, Robert Byron, Alan Clutton-Brock, Hugh Lygon, Anthony Powell and Colin Anderson.

In 1925 Acton moved to Christ Church, Oxford, with many of his friends, but remained for only one year. Brian Howard wrote a satirical profile of William Acton in his Continuation of Oxford Portraits of 1925-6 which appeared in the Cherwell. Other profiles were: David Herbert, Mark Ogilvie-Grant, René Crevel, Henry Thynne, 6th Marquess of Bath and Charles Plumb. In the previous issue the profiles had been Robert Byron, Harold Acton, John Sutro, Bryan Guinness, 2nd Baron Moyne, Edward Henry Charles James Fox-Strangways, 7th Earl of Ilchester. At Oxford William Acton's friends were Hugh Lygon, Robert Byron, Brian Howard, Michael Parsons, David Plunket Greene, Roy Harrod, Evelyn Waugh and John Sutro.

After college the Acton brothers were part of a circle including Diana Mitford and her first husband, Bryan Guinness, 2nd Baron Moyne, John Betjeman, Roy Harrod, Henry Yorke and his wife, Robert Byron, Evelyn Waugh, Randolph Churchill and Diana Churchill. William Acton sketched the Mitford sisters.

Not long after being demobilised from service in the Pioneer Corps during World War II, William Acton died on 31 August 1945 aged 39 after a short illness and is buried with his family at Cimitero degli Allori.

Several works by William Acton have been sold at auctions, including "Armiola" sold at Christie's in 2016 for £16,250 (£ in  sterling).

Gallery

References

1906 births
1945 deaths
English socialites
20th-century English painters
British Army personnel of World War II
Royal Pioneer Corps soldiers
English male painters
British expatriates in Italy
20th-century English male artists